Gerald S. "Gerry" McNamee (4 March 1934 – 17 November 1984) was a Canadian swimmer. He competed in three events at the 1952 Summer Olympics.

McNamee finished 2nd in the 1954 British Empire and Commonwealth Games 4 x 220 yards Freestyle Relay, 3rd in the 1955 Pan American Games 4 x 200 meter Freestyle Relay, fifth in the 1954 British Empire and Commonwealth Games 440 yards freestyle and sixth in the 1650 yards freestyle in the same event.

References

External links
 

1934 births
1984 deaths
Canadian male freestyle swimmers
Olympic swimmers of Canada
Swimmers at the 1952 Summer Olympics
Place of birth missing
Swimmers at the 1954 British Empire and Commonwealth Games
Commonwealth Games medallists in swimming
Commonwealth Games silver medallists for Canada
Swimmers at the 1955 Pan American Games
Pan American Games bronze medalists for Canada
Pan American Games medalists in swimming
Medalists at the 1955 Pan American Games
Medallists at the 1954 British Empire and Commonwealth Games